Orchesella capillata is a species of slender springtail in the family Entomobryidae.

References

Collembola
Articles created by Qbugbot
Animals described in 1936